Arnoldo Felipe Herrera Portuguez (born 7 March 1996) is a Costa Rican swimmer. He competed in the men's 100 metre breaststroke event at the 2017 World Aquatics Championships. In 2019, he represented Costa Rica at the 2019 World Aquatics Championships held in Gwangju, South Korea. He competed at the 2020 Summer Olympics.

References

External links
 

1996 births
Living people
Costa Rican male swimmers
Swimmers at the 2014 Summer Youth Olympics
Swimmers at the 2019 Pan American Games
Male breaststroke swimmers
Pan American Games competitors for Costa Rica
Swimmers at the 2020 Summer Olympics
Olympic swimmers of Costa Rica
Northern Michigan Wildcats athletes
21st-century Costa Rican people